The County Courts Act 1984 (c. 28) is an Act of the Parliament of the United Kingdom; the long title of the Act is "An Act to consolidate certain enactments relating to county courts". The Act replaced the County Courts Act 1959.

The County Court is an inferior court in the court system of England and Wales. The Act establishes various rules relating to this court.

Section 15 of the Act limits the type of case which can be heard by the County Court, the most important being libel and slander, an action for which may only be taken in the Queen's Bench Division of the High Court of Justice.

Section 69 of the Act enables a claimant to receive interest on sums awarded by the court.

References
Civil Procedure (The White Book), Thomson Sweet & Maxwell

United Kingdom Acts of Parliament 1984
English law
County courts in England and Wales